Chloe MacLean is a karate practitioner and sociology scholar based in Scotland. She has won the British karate championship for 9 times.

Sporting Career 
Her sporting achievements to date include being nine times British Champion, four times European 'Wado' Champion and twice Commonwealth Champion in Karate. She has also won medals at the World Senior 'Wado' Championship, European University Karate Championships, and Under-21 World Karate Championships.

Education 
She has completed an Undergraduate and Masters degrees and a PhD in Sociology. Whilst studying her undergraduate at the University of Edinburgh she participated in the Individual Performance Programme for seven years, and was awarded the prestigious Cameron Blue of the Year Award in 2012.

Awards 

 Senior Commonwealth Championship titles; Senior European Wado Championship wins; World Senior Wado Championship medal success; European University Karate Championship medal success; Under-21 World Karate Championship medal success; Eva Bailey Cup for the Female Athlete of the Year
 The European Association for Sociology of Sport gave her an award in 2017 for research that argued that "the unisex practice of karate particularly enables women karate practitioners to ‘undo’ conventional gendered embodiment"
 Research Impact and Knowledge Exchange Competition commendation

International Record

{|
|

References 

Scottish female karateka
Scottish sociologists
Scottish women sociologists
Living people
Year of birth missing (living people)
Alumni of the University of Edinburgh